Windecker Industries was an American aircraft manufacturer founded in 1962 as Windecker Research in Midland, Texas, by Leo Windecker, a dentist from Lake Jackson, Texas. In 1969, Windecker won Federal Aviation Administration (FAA) certification for the first-ever all-composite (fiberglass epoxy resin) airplane, the single-engine Windecker Eagle.

Early flight testing
Initial tests of composite wings on conventional airplane bodies began in 1958. Full FAA-supervised structural and flight testing began in 1961. In 1965, the company delivered a pair of composite wings to Cessna Aircraft Company, where they were subjected to structural and flight testing on a Cessna 182. Results proved promising, so the company built an experimental prototype of all-composite aircraft, the Windecker ACX-7 Eagle. Designed by Dr. Leo Windecker and his wife, Dr. Fairfax Windecker (also a dentist), the aircraft was molded from a unidirectional fiberglass called Fibaloy. The fuselage was made in two halves in full-size female molds and joined on the centerline, much as a model kit might be assembled; the wings were full-core foam around a tubular fiberglass fuel tank, with wing skins formed in full-size female molds. The first prototype, constructed in the Midland research center, flew in October 1967.

Eagle prototype
The certification Eagle prototype, incorporating retractable landing gear, crashed during spin testing for certification by the Federal Aviation Administration. After a redesign of the empennage, the Eagle AC-7 became the first composite airplane to receive FAA certification, in December 1969. (A number of composite sailplane designs had been certified by the FAA as early as 1967). Windecker went on to produce six civilian Eagles in the early 1970s.

The Eagle was faster than the high-performance airplanes it was designed to compete against. With the same gross weight (3,400 lbs), wing area (176 sq ft) and engine (285 hp Continental IO-520) as its competitors, the Eagle prototype was emblazoned with silhouettes of a Beech Bonanza, Cessna 210, and Bellanca Viking, testimony to outrunning those airplanes in side-by-side tests. Windecker results of back-to-back flight tests showed the Eagle to be 10 mph (16 km/h) faster than the Beech V35 Bonanza, even though it was almost 11 inches wider and over  longer. This speed advantage was due primarily to the optimum aerodynamic contours of the molded composite airframe. Additionally, the rigid sandwich-construction of its composite material skins prevented wrinkling and buckling under loads (a common occurrence with the thin aluminum skins of metal aircraft) which causes additional parasitic drag. The Eagle's low aspect ratio (of 5.82) rectangular wing, chosen for docile low-speed handling, probably reduced the Eagle's top speed.  In 1970, a tapered, higher aspect ratio wing was under development that was calculated to add 10 miles per hour to the Eagle's maximum speed.

Because of its unfamiliarity with composites, the Federal Aviation Agency required the Eagle be 20% stronger than airplanes made with aluminum. This resulted in the Eagle being  heavier than its non-composite competitors. The retractable-gear Eagle is no heavier than current production fixed-gear composite airplanes, such as the Cirrus SR22 and Cessna (formerly Columbia) 350, both certified in 1998.

Stealth technology proposed
Dr. Windecker believed that composite aircraft construction had a ready military application, because composites are nearly invisible to conventional radar systems. In 1962, he and Dow Chemical Company proposed a radar-invisible airplane to the Kennedy Administration, who showed no apparent interest. 1n 1971, he again proposed a stealth airplane to his congressman, George Mahon (D-Texas). Mahon contacted the Air Force, and a test of Dr. Windecker's personal Windecker Eagle was conducted against an Air Force radar system at Holloman AFB, New Mexico. The Air Force reported that the radar registered only the engine and the landing gear, not the plane's composite body. An Eagle, modified to reduce radar, infrared, acoustic and visual observables, was tested by the U.S. Army at Aberdeen Proving Ground, Maryland in 1972 under the code name CADDO. The results were compelling, prompting the U.S. Air Force and DARPA to order an Eagle built from scratch to minimize radar detectability. Windecker built Eagle serial number 9, incorporating numerous modifications to reduce its radar detectability, and delivered it in February 1973 as the YE-5 to the Air Force who tested it secretly for five years at Eglin AFB, Florida. It was then transferred to the Army, who continued testing its stealth application for many years. Eventually, the Army transferred the YE-5 to the Army Aviation Museum at Fort Rucker, Alabama. The YE-5 was destroyed during classified testing in the late 1980s. The Army Aviation Museum received Eagle serial number 5, N4196G, to replace the lost stealth prototype. Eagle N4196G is in storage at Fort Rucker and not on display.

Military contracts
Windecker Industries continued with military contracts, designing and building the U.S. Air Force Aequare remotely piloted vehicle (now called UAVs) for the Lockheed Missiles and Space Company. 36 of the air-launched, 150-lb laser-target-designator UAV were delivered and flown at White Sands, New Mexico in 1975 and 1976.

Financial difficulties
The company was grossly undercapitalized and struggled financially after running out of money and laying off its almost 300 employees in the fall of 1970. The principal owner and Board Chairman of Windecker Industries, a West Texas oilman and rancher, unwilling to accept the terms of numerous financial offers over the following six years, closed the company in 1976, stopping work on ongoing stealth and UAV projects for Lockheed and the U.S. military. A company restart attempt was made in 1977 by Gerry Dietrick, owner of Eagle N4198G, who attempted to buy the rights and tooling, but no more aircraft were constructed. Gerry Dietrick set five trans-Atlantic world speed records in his Eagle, including New York to Paris, besting the previous record holder, a Beechcraft Bonanza, by 13 miles per hour.

Achievements
Leo Windecker received twenty-two U.S. patents (and many more foreign patents) for all aspects of composite aircraft construction, most of which were assigned to the Dow Chemical Company, which funded the research.  This technology was licensed to other firms such as Lockheed Martin, Northrop and the DeLorean Motor Company. In 2003, Leo Windecker was inducted into the Texas Aviation Hall of Fame, and he has been nominated for the National Aviation Hall of Fame.

Windecker Eagle N4197G (S/N 006) was donated to the National Air and Space Museum in 1985; it waits in storage, although it is planned to be put on display in the museum's new Udvar-Hazy facility at the Dulles Airport. In October 2008 NASA officials inadvertently displayed the aircraft in the background of a number of photographs published on the web while they uncrated some of the Apollo heat shields. 

Leo Windecker's Eagle, N4195G (S/N 004), is on display in the Lake Jackson Historical Society Museum in Lake Jackson, Texas .  Dr. Windecker died on 13 February 2010, at Cedar Park, Texas.

In May 2000, the editors of Air & Space Magazine selected the Windecker Eagle as their choice for the best aviation idea that was “ahead of its time.”

See also
 Windecker Eagle
 Windecker E-5

References 

 Windecker, Dr. Leo. Personal recollection.
 e.g., FAA Type Certificate G12EU, Glasflugel H-301 Libelle, 31 May 1967
 Windecker, Ted. Personal Recollection.
 "A Resin in the Sun." Flying Magazine, May, 1970.
 Burmeier, Beverly. "Plastic Fantastic." The History Channel Magazine, September/October 2005, pp. 22–23.
 "The Eagle Returns", Private Pilot Magazine, Sept. 1978.

Midland County, Texas
Defunct aircraft manufacturers of the United States
Vehicle manufacturing companies established in 1962
1962 establishments in Texas
Vehicle manufacturing companies disestablished in 1976
1976 disestablishments in Texas